Sakit Aliyev (22 December 1965 – 12 October 2015) was an Azerbaijani professional footballer who most notable played as a defender for Turan Tovuz and the Azerbaijan national team. Aliyev also managed Turan Tovuz on two occasions, between 2006 and 2007 and again in 2010.

On 12 October 2015, after a long illness, Aliyev died in his home town of Turan.

Honours
 Turan Tovuz
 Azerbaijan Top League (1): 1993–94
 Kapaz
 Azerbaijan Top League (1): 1997–98
 Azerbaijan Cup (1): 1997–98

References

External links
 

1965 births
2015 deaths
Azerbaijani footballers
Soviet footballers
Azerbaijani football managers
People from Tovuz
Soviet Azerbaijani people
Association football defenders
Azerbaijan international footballers